
Year 98 BC was a year of the pre-Julian Roman calendar. At the time it was known as the Year of the Consulship of Nepos and Didius (or, less frequently, year 656 Ab urbe condita) and the Third Year of Tianhan. The denomination 98 BC for this year has been used since the early medieval period, when the Anno Domini calendar era became the prevalent method in Europe for naming years.

Events 
 By place 

 Roman Republic 
 Consuls: Quintus Caecilius Metellus Nepos and Titus Didius
 The Senate passes the Lex Caecilia Didia which bans omnibus bills.

 Asia 
 Emperor Wu of Han sends the Han general Gongsun Ao on a mission to rescue general Li Ling from Xiongnu captivity. Gongsun achieves little but receives incorrect information that Li has been training Xiongnu soldiers. Enraged, Emperor Wu exterminates Li's clan.

Births 
 Nigidius Figulus, Roman philosopher (probable date) (d. 45 BC)
 Terentia, first wife of Cicero (d. AD 4).

Deaths 
 Emperor Kaika of Japan, according to legend.

References